Herochroma scoblei is a moth of the family Geometridae first described by Hiroshi Inoue in 1992. It is found on Sulawesi, Indonesia.

References

Moths described in 1992
Pseudoterpnini
Moths of Indonesia